Andre Parker, known by his stage name Chink Santana, is an American R&B musician and producer from Washington, D.C.  His achievements include co-producing Ashanti, the debut album from the singer of the same name, as well as working on her follow-up, Chapter II. He also co-wrote and produced tracks on Judgement Days, the second album by English singer/rapper Ms. Dynamite.  He was also part of the making of Jim Jones' album, Hustler's P.O.M.E. (Product of My Environment).

Early career

Originally from Washington, D.C., Santana was an original member of the rap group CCOC (Cap City Outzyda Clique) and a member of the Junkyard Band. Irv Gotti of Murder Inc. Records heard an independent release by CCOC and, impressed with Santana's production work, brought him into his The Inc. company.

Cameos and featured appearances
He co-starred with Keyshia Cole in her "I Should Have Cheated" music video as her cheating boyfriend. Santana also appeared as singer Ashanti's love interest in the music video for her single "Don't Let Them".

Production credits

2002
Ashanti – Ashanti
Intro
Happy
Scared
Baby
Over
More Than a Woman – Toni Braxton
Me & My Boyfriend

2003
Chapter II – Ashanti
Intro/Medley
Shany's World
Rock Wit U (Awww Baby)
Breakup 2 Makeup
Rain On Me
Then Ya Gone
Living My Life
Black Child (Skit)
Feel So Good
Carry On
The Story of 2
Ohhh Ahhh
U Say, I Say
I Don't Mind
Outro
Ashanti's Christmas – Ashanti
Christmas Time Again

2004
Southside – Lloyd
Feelin You
Hustler
Concrete Rose – Ashanti
So Hot

2005
The Way It Is – Keyshia Cole
Situations
Judgement Days – Ms. Dynamite
Judgement Day
Father
Put Your Gun Away
You Don't Have To Cry
Unbreakable
Gotta Let It Go
She Don't Live Here Anymore
Exodus – Ja Rule
Thug Lovin'
Mesmerize
Exodus (Outro)

2006
Hustler's P.O.M.E. (Product of My Environment) – Jim Jones
So Harlem
Emotionless
Get It Poppin'
I Know

2007
Mixtape Messiah 3 – Chamillionaire
Rain

2008
The Mirror – Ja Rule
Enemy of the State
Sing A Prayer For Me
Tha Comeback – Lil J

2009
Pray IV Reign – Jim Jones
Album Intro
Pulling Me Back
Medicine
Frienemies
Precious
Girlfriend

2010
Calling All Hearts – Keyshia Cole
Take Me Away
What You Do To Me

2013
Pimps in the Pulpit – Pastor Troy & Jack Trip
 Money & The Power
 See No Evil
 It Ain't My Fault
 Honey
 Precious Girl
 Feds Is Comin

2018
Pimps in the Pulpit 2 – Pastor Troy & Jack Trip
 Respect The Block
 Rep Ur City
 400 Degreez
 Money & Power
 You Don't Want It
 Oou

Filmography

References

Living people
Record producers from Washington, D.C.
Songwriters from Washington, D.C.
American male songwriters
Participants in American reality television series
Year of birth missing (living people)